Jacques Léonard Muller (11 December 1749 – 1 October 1824) commanded the Army of the Western Pyrenees and the Army of the Rhine during the French Revolutionary Wars. He was a product of the French Royal Army which he joined in 1765. He became a captain in 1791 and soon formed a unit from the disbanded Swiss regiments of the old army. He fought at Jemappes and then transferred to the War Office. Promoted to general officer in July 1793 he was appointed chief of staff to the Army of the Pyrenees. In October 1793 he assumed command of that army despite being outranked by ten other generals. He immediately set about providing a good organization for his motley host. A major Spanish attack on the Sans Culottes Camp was repulsed in February 1794.

Muller was finally promoted to general of division in April 1794. In July and August his army captured the Baztan Valley and San Sebastián. He soon resigned his command and was replaced by Bon-Adrien Jeannot de Moncey. He transferred to the Army of the Alps as a division commander. In 1799 while he led the Army of the Rhine, he was beaten at Mannheim but he successfully lured the Austrians away from Switzerland. He served in various non-combat posts during the Napoleonic Wars and died in 1824. His surname is one of the names inscribed under the Arc de Triomphe, on Column 33.

References

French generals
Military leaders of the French Revolutionary Wars
French Republican military leaders of the French Revolutionary Wars
French military personnel of the Napoleonic Wars
People from Thionville
1749 births
1824 deaths
Names inscribed under the Arc de Triomphe